The 2007 Vodafone Rally de Portugal was the 41st Rally de Portugal and the fifth round of the 2007 World Rally Championship season. It took place between March 30–April 1, 2007 and consisted of 18 special stages. 61 drivers finished the rally and the winner was Citroën's Sébastien Loeb, followed by Subaru's Petter Solberg and Citroën's Dani Sordo.

All Ford Focus RS WRC 06 drivers were given five-minute time penalties, because the glass used in the cars' rear side windows was 0.5 mm too thin. This dropped Marcus Grönholm from second to fourth, Mikko Hirvonen from third to fifth, Jari-Matti Latvala from sixth to eighth and Henning Solberg from ninth to 11th.

Results

Retirements 
  Luís Pérez Companc - retired before SS1;
  Juan Pablo Raies - retired before SS1;
  Guy Wilks - rolled (SS3);
  Martin Prokop - mechanical (SS5);
  Mads Østberg - retired after first leg (SS7/8);
  Toni Gardemeister - excluded for driving on three wheels.
  Michał Kościuszko - went off the road (SS9);
  Chris Atkinson - went off the road (SS10);

Special Stages 
All dates and times are WEST (UTC+1).

Championship standings after the event

Drivers' championship

Manufacturers' championship

References

External links 

 Results on official site - WRC.com
 Results on eWRC-results.com
 Results on RallyBase.nl

Portugal
Rally Portugal, 2007
Rally de Portugal